Hans Olle Johansson (born 5 June 1957) is a retired Swedish sailor. He competed in the mixed two person dinghy event at the 1976 Summer Olympics, together with his elder brother Lars, and finished in 20th place.

References 

1957 births
Living people
Olympic sailors of Sweden
Swedish male sailors (sport)
Sailors at the 1976 Summer Olympics – 470